Clear Venstre or Clear Left (Danish: Rene Venstre), also known as Bergske Venstre or Bergske Left was a political group from 1884 to 1897. It was one of two groups splitting from Venstre of the Folketing in 1884, the other being Moderate Venstre.

History 
Clear Venstre was founded by Christen Berg in 1884, after Venstre of the Folketing split into two groups, with Berg leading one group and Viggo Hørup leading the other. Clear Venstre opposed the government of Jacob Estrup. Among politicians joining Berg's group were Theodor Leth, Jens Christian Christensen, Ingvard Jensen, Kristen Jensen-Try and Peter Jensen-Stengaarden. The group would later attempt to cooperate with the Moderate Left, with the cooperation called "the Danish Left" (Danish: Det Danske Venstre) 

Berg remained the leader of the group until his death in 1891, after which Jens Christian Christensen took over the leadership. Even after the group joined the Venstre Reform Party, it wasn't officially dissolved and Christensen remained the front figure of the group.

Leaders

See also 
 List of political parties in Denmark
 Politics of Denmark

References 

1884 establishments in Denmark
Political parties established in 1884
Liberal parties in Denmark